Eddie Dew Memorial Airpark , is a privately owned airport near Toronto, Ohio, U.S., part of the Pittsburgh Combined Statistical Area.  The airport opened in December 1937. Twenty-two aircraft are reported as being based at the airport; approximately 2,850 aircraft movements per year take place.

In 2009, flight restrictions were imposed at the airport due to the 2009 G-20 Pittsburgh summit.

References

External links 

 Pittsburgh G 20 restrictions

Airports in Ohio
Transportation in Jefferson County, Ohio
Buildings and structures in Jefferson County, Ohio
Toronto, Ohio
Privately owned airports